The discography of Israeli psychedelic trance duo Infected Mushroom consists of twelve studio albums, one compilation album, four extended plays, thirty singles, and ten music videos.

Studio albums

Compilation albums

Extended plays

Charted singles

Other singles

As featured artist 
 Paul Oakenfold – "I'm Alive" (2011)

Remixes
 Vini Vici & Pixel - Anything & Everything (Infected Mushroom Remix)
 The Doors - Riders on the Storm (Infected Mushroom Remix)
 Pegboard Nerds – Hero (Infected Mushroom Remix)
 Dudu Tassa & Berry Sakharof - La Trib Ani Utruch (Infected Mushroom Remix)

Music videos

Notes
 Cover of Black Velvet by Alannah Myles.

References

Electronic music discographies
Discographies of Israeli artists